Kenneth Einar Himma is an American philosopher, author, lawyer, academic and lecturer.

Born in Seattle, Himma earned his bachelor's degree from the University of Illinois in 1985, his masters from the University of California in 1987, and his doctorate of law from the University of Washington School of Law in 1990, before receiving his PhD in 2001 from the University of Washington for his thesis, "The Status of Legal Principles".

Himma specialises in philosophy of law, philosophy of information, information ethics, social philosophy, political philosophy and philosophy of religion, and has authored dozens of academic papers in these fields. From 2004 until 2011 he worked as a professor in the philosophy department of Seattle Pacific University, after which he began lecturing part-time at the University of Washington School of Law.

In 2007, Himma was elected to the editorial board of the Journal of Information Ethics and the board of directors for the International Society for Ethics and Information Technology. He currently serves on the Editorial Advisory Boards of the Journal of Information, Communication and Ethics in Society and the International Review of Information Ethics and the Editorial Boards of Computers and Society and the International Journal of Cyber Ethics in Education

In 2010, he was nominated for the World Technology Network's World Technology Award for Ethics, and in 2012, he was awarded a Fulbright Candidate Grant for Keynote at IVR Conference at Faculty of Law at University of Belgrade.

Himma has had numerous opinion pieces published in The Seattle Times. He has also contributed several entries to the Internet Encyclopedia of Philosophy, with commentary on the subjects of legal and religious philosophy. Some of his scholarly papers have attracted responses and commentaries from Francis J. Beckwith, Thomas Metzinger, Greg Dawes, Alison Adam, David Gunkel, Mark Coeckelbergh, Matthew Kramer and Scott J. Shapiro.

Partial bibliography

Books

References

External links
 Curriculum Vitae: Kenneth Einar Himma at the University of Washington School of Law

1957 births
Academics from Washington (state)
American ethicists
American political philosophers
Lawyers from Seattle
Philosophers of law
Philosophers of religion
Philosophers from Washington (state)
Seattle Pacific University faculty
University of Washington School of Law faculty
Writers from Seattle
Living people